Max Kulke (born 10 November 2000) is a German professional footballer who plays as a midfielder for Dynamo Dresden.

Career
Kulke made his professional debut for Dynamo Dresden in the 2. Bundesliga on 23 February 2019, starting in the away match against Darmstadt 98 before being substituted out at half-time for Barış Atik, with the match finishing as a 2–0 loss.

On 11 January 2022, Kulke was loaned to ZFC Meuselwitz in Regionalliga Nordost.

References

External links
 
 

2000 births
Living people
People from Görlitz (district)
Footballers from Saxony
German footballers
Association football midfielders
Dynamo Dresden players
ZFC Meuselwitz players
2. Bundesliga players
3. Liga players
Regionalliga players